Leminda is a genus of nudibranchs in the family Lemindidae.

The one species in this genus of marine gastropod molluscs has so far only been found around the South African coast.

Taxonomy 
Leminda has been considered as the only genus in the family Lemindidae Griffiths, 1985. Leminda is the type genus of the family Lemindidae.

Description

The body of these animals is robust and elevated, and has a velum, or anterior veil. The margin of the mantle is expanded and waving and is held above the body. The foot is large and well-developed. The rhinophores are smooth and retract into smooth small sheaths. The radula is broad and arranged in multiple series with hook-shaped teeth. The digestive gland branches extensively into the mantle margin. The animal has no eyes. A bag used in copulation opens between the male and female reproductive openings

Etymology
The genus name comes from an adaptation of the describing author's daughter's name.

Species
There is only one species of Leminda described, the type species Leminda millecra Griffiths, 1985 from southern South Africa.

References

External links
 Griffiths R.J. 1985. Description of a new South African Arminacean and the proposed re-instatement of the genus Atthila Bergh (Mollusca, Opisthobranchia). Annals of the South African Museum, 269-280

Nudibranchia
Monotypic gastropod genera